The following lists events that happened during 2014 in the Republic of Estonia.

Incumbents
 President: Toomas Hendrik Ilves 
 Prime Minister: Andrus Ansip (until 26 March), Taavi Rõivas (starting 26 March)

Events

February
 February 23 - Estonian Prime Minister Andrus Ansip announces that he will be leaving office before scheduled parliamentary elections in 2015.

March
 March 4 - Andrus Ansip resigns after nine years as prime minister of Estonia.
 March 26 - Taavi Rõivas is sworn in as Prime Minister of Estonia, succeeding Andrus Ansip and becoming the youngest government leader in the European Union at 34 years.

September
 September 3 - The President of the United States, Barack Obama, visits Estonia in a move to reassure the Baltic states ahead of a NATO summit in Wales.
 September 5 - Eston Kohver is abducted by gunpoint from the Estonian side of the border by the FSB.

October
 October 9 - Estonia becomes the first former Soviet republic to legalize gay partnerships and grant equal rights to same-sex couples.
 October 27 - The first school shooting in Estonia takes place in Viljandi.

See also
2014 in Estonian television

References

 
2010s in Estonia
Years of the 21st century in Estonia
Estonia
Estonia